Klyucharyovo is a rural locality (a village) in Chishminsky District, Bashkortostan, Russia. The population was 70 as of 2010. There are 10 streets.

Geography 
Klyucharyovo is located 32 km east of Chishmy (the district's administrative centre) by road. Sanatoriya Yumatova imeni 15-letiya BASSR is the nearest rural locality.

References 

Rural localities in Chishminsky District